Lagos is a settlement in the Xanthi regional unit of Greece. It is part of the community Nea Kessani. It is situated on the bar separating Lake Vistonida from the Aegean Sea. In 1991, the settlement contained 371 inhabitants.

External links

Greek Travel Pages - Lagos
Lake Vistonis / Porto Lagos, Greece

Populated places in Xanthi (regional unit)
Natura 2000 in Greece

ar:لاغوس، إفروس